This is a list of the members of the 10th Riigikogu, following the 2003 election.

Election results

Lists

By party

Estonian Centre Party (28)

Res Publica (28)

Estonian Reform Party (19)

People's Union of Estonia (13)

Pro Patria Union (7)

Moderate People's Party (6)

By votes

References

10th